Jon Welsh (born 13 October 1986) is a Scotland international rugby union player, most recently with Newcastle Falcons.  Welsh was previously at Glasgow Warriors. Welsh is a former Junior boxing champion, in the end choosing to play rugby professionally.

Club career
Welsh begun playing professionally for Glasgow Warriors around 2008 and was named in the Pro12 Dream Team at the end of the 2011/12 season. One of the high points of Welsh's club rugby career came at Glasgow Warriors. He was a key member of the 2015 Pro12 Grand Final winning squad and played for Glasgow in the playoff final against Irish side Munster. Glasgow had, a year previously, lost the 2014 final against Leinster. Welsh also featured in that final, making it second time lucky in 2015. 

Welsh signed for Newcastle Falcons later the same year  Although his time at Falcons was frequently disrupted by injury, especially towards the end of his time with the club and after an ACL rupture early in the 2019-20 season as he sought to regain fitness, his contract was terminated in December 2019.  After a twelve-month hiatus, in January 2021 Welsh rejoined the Falcons on a short-term deal until the end of the season. Unfortunately, he appeared just once in this period, as another serious injury was sustained against Leicester Tigers when he dislocated his shoulder.  At the end of the 2021 season, Welsh was released by the Falcons.

International career
On 1 September 2015 Welsh was named in Vern Cotter's Scotland squad for the 2015 Rugby World Cup. On 18 October 2015 he was involved in a controversial incident in the final minutes of Scotland's quarter-final against Australia. Scotland were defending a 34–32 lead going into the final minutes when a penalty was given by referee Craig Joubert for an apparent offside offence committed by Welsh. The ball had been knocked forward by John Hardie and was also touched by Australian scrum-half Nick Phipps before Welsh picked the ball up. Had Joubert deemed Phipps' touch to be intentional, then the penalty would have been downgraded to an Australian scrum. Bernard Foley kicked the resulting penalty and sent Australia through.

References

External links
Newcastle Falcons profile

1986 births
Living people
Scottish rugby union players
Newcastle Falcons players
Scotland international rugby union players
Rugby union props
People educated at Eastwood High School, Newton Mearns
Rugby union players from Glasgow
Glasgow Hutchesons Aloysians RFC players
Glasgow Warriors players
Whitecraigs RFC players
Aberdeen GSFP RFC players
Ayr RFC players
West of Scotland FC players
Glasgow Hawks players
Scotland Club XV international rugby union players